Gasparilla International Film Festival (GIFF, stylized as gịff) is an annual independent film festival that takes place in Tampa Bay, Florida. The festival is run by the Tampa Film Institute, a non-profit organization dedicated to advancing film education and supporting filmmakers in the Tampa Bay area. The first Gasparilla Film Festival took place in 2007.

History
The Gasparilla Film Festival is run by the Tampa Film Institute, a 501(c)(3) non-profit organization. Founded in 2006, the Tampa Film Festival is dedicated to advancing film education and supporting filmmakers, along with community involvement in film in the Tampa Bay area.

The inaugural Gasparilla Film Festival was held in 2007. Films screened at the festival include Color Me Obsessed, screened in 2011; The Iceman, screened in 2013; Enemy and Boys of Abu Ghraib, both screened in 2014; Whit Stillman's Love & Friendship, screened in 2016; François Ozon's Frantz, screened in 2017; Nia DaCosta's Little Woods, screened in 2019; and Potsy Ponciroli's Old Henry and Michael Glover Smith's Relative, both screened in 2022. Since 2015, the festival has been sponsored by Suncoast Credit Union.

In addition to the annual film festival, GIFF provides local residents with monthly screenings of the Global Lens series at the Tampa Museum of Art, and other special film and entertainment events year round. The festival also hosts a High School competition for local high school short films.

MovieMaker magazine named it one of the "Top 50 Film Festivals Worth the Entry Fee" from 2013-2015 and summed up the festival's programming philosophy as "less is more" in a 2017 article, which noted that "GIFF focuses on treating every one of its curated screenings as a major event".

References

External links
 Official website

Film festivals in Florida
Festivals in Tampa, Florida
2006 establishments in Florida
Film festivals established in 2006